The 9th IAAF World Half Marathon Championships was held on November 12, 2000, in the city of Veracruz, Mexico. A total of 182 athletes, 121 men and 61 women, from 52 countries took part.
Detailed reports on the event and an appraisal of the results was given.

Complete results were published.

Medallists

Race Results

Men's

Women's

Team Results

Men's

Women's

Participation
The participation of 182 athletes (121 men/61 women) from 52 countries is reported.

 (6)
 (2)
 (4)
 (4)
 (3)
 (5)
 (2)
 (5)
 (1)
 (3)
 (1)
 (6)
 (2)
 (2)
 (2)
 (1)
 (8)
 (2)
 (6)
 (1)
 (6)
 (1)
 (1)
 (5)
 (8)
 (7)
 (3)
 (3)
 (4)
 (9)
 (1)
 (2)
 (1)
 (1)
 (1)
 (1)
 (1)
 (3)
 (5)
 (4)
 (2)
 (1)
 (10)
 (5)
 (1)
 (3)
 (2)
 (3)
 (6)
 (10)
 (3)
 (3)

See also
2000 in athletics (track and field)

References

External links
Official website

IAAF World Half Marathon Championships
Half Marathon Championships
World Athletics Half Marathon Championships
International athletics competitions hosted by Mexico
November 2000 sports events in Mexico